This list of ship launches in the 15th century includes a chronological list of some ships launched from 1400 to 1499.

References 

15th-century ships
1400